Game of Danger is a 1962 thriller novel by Lois Duncan.

Plot
Teenager Annie and her young brother Rob receive a phone call from their mother instructing them to leave their home in the middle of the night with an important letter. The two arrive at the bus terminal at 2 AM and leave for the home of a family friend at their mother's urging; meanwhile, newspaper headlines regarding Annie and Rob's father and his alleged communist ties begin to circulate. The children's embarking leads them on an odyssey to uncover the truth.

Reception
A review published by Kirkus Reviews noted that: "The pieces of the puzzle take awhile to together, but the is well worth the reader's time... This is melodrama that involves the reader all the way through."

References

External links
Game of Danger at Fantastic Fiction

1962 American novels
Novels about child abduction
American thriller novels
American young adult novels
Novels by Lois Duncan
Dodd, Mead & Co. books